Vilma is a Philippine television variety show broadcast by GMA Network. Hosted by Vilma Santos, it premiered on August 8, 1986 on the network's Friday evening line up. The show concluded on September 29, 1995 with a total of 479 episodes. It was replaced by Bubble Gang in its timeslot.

Overview
Formerly known as Vilma In Person, Vilma! (also known as Vilma! on Seven) premiered on August 8, 1986. The pilot episode was filmed from the Metropolitan Theater where Vilma Santos and the VIP Dancers regularly performed there until 1987 when the show moved to GMA Broadway Studios. The show received four nominations in the PMPC Star Awards for TV from 1988 to 1990, 1992 and 1994, as well as Best Female Musical Variety Show Host from 1987 to 1988. There were also anniversary and birthday specials from 1987 to 1994.

Cast

Host
 Vilma Santos

Dancers
 V.I.P. Dancers

Segments
OFF-Cam with Vi!
Cafe Vi!
Vilma's Music Watch

Ratings
Vilma is one of the highest-rated television shows in Philippine history, reaching 47% national ratings nationwide.

Accolades

References

External links
 

1986 Philippine television series debuts
1995 Philippine television series endings
Filipino-language television shows
GMA Network original programming
Philippine variety television shows